One Way Ticket is a 1935 American crime film directed by Herbert Biberman starring Lloyd Nolan, Peggy Conklin and Walter Connolly. The film is based on the 1934 novel One-Way Ticket by Ethel Turner.

It is a prison drama in which a man becomes a robber following the authorities' failure to convict a corrupt banker.

It was the directorial debut of Biberman, a playwright and theatre director of Marxist political leanings; following some theatrical success in New York, he signed a two-picture deal with Columbia in 1934, and it was followed by Meet Nero Wolfe in 1936.

Critical reception
Writing for The Spectator in 1936, Graham Greene gave the film a mildly good review, judging it to be well acted and describing it as "criticiz[ing] as well as thrill[ing]". Greene drew particular attention to the prison break scene as the film's "one excellent sequence".

References

External links
 
 
 
 

1935 films
American crime drama films
Columbia Pictures films
Films directed by Herbert Biberman
Films based on Australian novels
American black-and-white films
1935 crime drama films
1930s English-language films
1930s American films